Krakra is a village in Valchi Dol Municipality, in Varna Province, north-eastern Bulgaria. The village is named after the 11th century Bulgarian noble Krakra, governor of Pernik. As of 2007 it had a population of 20 people.

References

Villages in Varna Province